Zhang Kai, (born December 1, 1982) is a retired professional basketball player from China. A centre, he played for the Dongguan Leopards of the Chinese Basketball Association (CBA). He was also a member of the Sacramento Kings' 2008–09 training camp team, but did not make the final roster.

Notes

External links 
 Zhang Kai at Sina.com
 Sacramento Kings 2008-09 training camp roster at Kings' official website

1982 births
Living people
Centers (basketball)
Chinese men's basketball players
Chinese expatriates in the United States
Shenzhen Leopards players